Bamidele Aturu (October 16, 1964 – July 9, 2014)was a Nigerian Lawyer and human rights activist.

Life and career
Aturu was born on 16 October 1964 in Ogbagi Ondo State, Nigeria to the family of Aturu. He studied physics at Adeyemi College of Education in Ondo State, Nigeria. 
He proceeded to Obafemi Awolowo University in 1989, to study law and graduated with LL.B in 1994. He later attended  Nigerian Law School and was called to the Bar in 1995. He obtained a master's degree in law (LL.M) from the prestigious, University of Lagos in 1996.

In 2010, he took the Council for Legal Education to court, demanding for the reduction in the fees that increase the chances of indigent Law students to make it to the Law School. 
Also in 2012, he wrote to the former Governor of the Central Bank of Nigeria, Sanusi Lamido Sanusi, asking him to disclose his salary, allowances and other entitlements. He was committed to representing the oppressed individuals and groups.
He was the author of several law books, including A Handbook of Nigerian Labour Laws, Nigerian Labour Laws, Elections and the Law.
He turned down his nomination, as a representative of the civil society, in the National Conference on the basis that the conference, could not meet the expectations of Nigerians.
He died in Lagos on July 9, 2014, and was buried in his hometown, Ogbagi Akoko, Ondo state Nigeria. He had two children.

See also
Babatunde Omidina

References

See also
Ondo State

1964 births
2014 deaths
University of Lagos alumni
Obafemi Awolowo University alumni
20th-century Nigerian lawyers
People from Ondo State
Yoruba legal professionals
Adeyemi College of Education alumni
Burials in Ondo State
21st-century Nigerian lawyers
Nigerian human rights activists